Itan Daniel Chavira (born November 2, 1987, in Big Bear, California) is a former American minor league ice hockey forward currently playing for the USA National Inline Team and the Ripon Savage of American Inline Hockey League.

Playing career
Chavira played junior hockey in the United States Hockey League (USHL) with the Ohio Junior Blue Jackets in 2006-2007. The following year, he played for the Charlottetown Abbies and the  Yarmouth Mariners in the Maritime Junior A Hockey League and recorded a junior career-high 41 goals, 44 assists and 85 points, while the Mariners finished as the MJAHL Championship, before ending the season in the Fred Page Cup.

Chavira ended his junior hockey league career by turning pro with the Ontario Reign of the ECHL. However, Chavira only played 16 games, registering 2 goals and 4 assists.

US National Inline Team
Chavira has been of member of the US National Inline team for the previous two World Championships. During the 2008 tournament, he finished tied for 5th in scoring in the tournament, recording 3 goals and 7 assists in 6 games, en route to a 4th-place finish.

References

 
 

1987 births
Living people
Ontario Reign (ECHL) players
People from Big Bear Lake, California
Sportspeople from San Bernardino County, California
Inline hockey players
World Games gold medalists
Competitors at the 2013 World Games
American men's ice hockey forwards